Neo-Miltonic Syllabics is a meter devised by Robert Bridges. It was first employed by the poet in a group of poems composed between 1921 and 1925, and collected in his book New Verse (1925). In "Kate's Mother," included in New Verse, Bridges had found that form which he later employed in The Testament of Beauty, a book-length poem written when he was over eighty. He arrived at that syllabic meter used in the New Verse collection by way of his earlier detailed analysis of  John Milton's versification in Milton's Prosody (1889, rev. ed. 1921).

The first poem in this form was "Poor Poll" which F. T. Prince regarded as the best illustration of Bridges' meter. Prince later adopted Neo-Miltonic Syllabics when writing his own work, Afterword on Rupert Brooke (1976).

Notes

References
 Bridges, Robert: The Poetical Works of Robert Bridges, Oxford Editions of Standard Authors, Oxford University Press, 2nd edition, 1936.
 Prince, F.T., Collected Poems: 1935 – 1992, The Sheep Meadow Press, 1993. . See the author's note to the poem Afterword on Rupert Brooke.
 Stanford, Donald E.: In the Classic Mode: The Achievement of Robert Bridges, Associated University Presses, 1978. 

Poetic rhythm
John Milton